Un Segundo en el Tiempo is the second studio album by Latin Superstar Mexican Cristian Castro, it was released on July 20, 1993. The album itself did not chart on the Billboard, however, the track, Nunca Voy a Olvidarte, reached #1 on Hot Latin Tracks of 1993.

Track listing

 "Nunca Voy a Olvidarte" - 5:02
 "Mujer Especial" ("Color Blind") - 4:30
 "Por Amor a Tí" - 3:50
 "Es mejor Así" - 4:00
 "Soy" - 3:48
 "Lo Voy a Intentar" - 4:00
 "Nunca Jamás" - 4:30
 "Puerto Rico" - 4:13
 "Canta una Canción de Amor" - 4:10
 "Fuiste Mia" - 4:20
 "Un Segundo en el Tiempo" - 4:45

Mexican Edition

 "Es mejor Así" - 4:00
 "Por amor a Ti" - 3:50
 "Mujer Especial" ["Color Blind"] - 4:30
 "Un Segundo en el Tiempo" - 4:45
 "Lo voy a Intentar" ["Dejame Intentar"] - 4:00
 "Nunca voy a Olvidarte" - 5:02
 "Soy" 3:48
 "Fuiste Mia" - 4:20
 "Nunca Jamás" - 4:30
 "Canta una Canción de Amor" - 4:10
 "Puerto Rico" - 4:13

International Edition

 "Por amor a Ti" - 3:50
 "Es mejor Así" - 4:00
 "Soy" - 3:48
 "Lo voy a Intentar" ["Dejame Intentar"] - 4:00
 "Puerto Rico" - 4:13
 "Canta una Canción de Amor" - 4:10
 "Nunca voy a Olvidarte" - 5:02
 "Mujer Especial" ["Color Blind"] - 4:30
 "Fuiste Mia" - 4:20
 "Un Segundo en el Tiempo" - 4:45
 "Nunca Jamás" - 4:30

References

1993 albums
Cristian Castro albums
Fonovisa Records albums